From the Front Row ... Live! is a live audio-DVD album by the Canadian rock band April Wine, released in 2003. As with all these 'From the Front Row ... Live!' releases this is a rehash of previously existing King Biscuit Flower Hour recordings with the track sequence rearranged. These recordings feature some of the band's hits. Released 2003 in Canada 2004 UK/US

Track listing
All tracks written by Myles Goodwyn unless otherwise noted.
 "21st Century Schizoid Man" (R. Fripp, M. Giles, G. Lake, I. McDonald, P. Sinfield) 	
 "I Like to Rock"
 "Roller" 	
 "Sign of the Gypsy Queen" (Lorence Hud) 	
 "Just Between You and Me" 	
 "If You See Kay" (David Freeland) 	
 "Enough is Enough"	
 "Waiting on a Miracle" 	
 "Crash and Burn" 	
 "Future Tense"	
 "Anything You Want, You Got It" 	
 "You Could Have Been a Lady" (Errol Brown, Tony Wilson)	
 "All Over Town"	
 "Oowatanite" (J. Clench)	
 "Before the Dawn" (B. Greenway)

Special features
24-bit, 96 kHz DVD Audio and 24-bit, 48 kHz Dolby Digital 5.1 options, stunning surround sound, plays on all DVD players, artist photos.

Personnel
 Myles Goodwyn – lead & background vocals, guitars
 Brian Greenway – vocals, guitars
 Gary Moffet – guitars, background vocals
 Steve Lang – bass, background vocals
 Jerry Mercer – drums, background vocals

References

April Wine albums
2003 live albums
MCA Records live albums